Martyr is a genus of beetles in the family Carabidae, containing the following species:

 Martyr alter Semenov & Znojko, 1929
 Martyr praeteritorum Semenov & Znojko, 1929

References

Licininae